Oasis State Park is a state park of New Mexico, United States, located north of Portales in Roosevelt County. It is a common destination for nearby residents and features a small fishing lake and several sand dunes.

Although the water quality in the centralized body of water in which the park surrounds is poor, the park itself has significant sand dunes and interesting scenery.

References

External links
 Oasis State Park

State parks of New Mexico
Parks in Roosevelt County, New Mexico
Protected areas established in 1961
1961 establishments in New Mexico